The Sacred Wood is a collection of 20 essays by T. S. Eliot, first published in 1920.  Topics include Eliot's opinions of many literary works and authors, including Shakespeare's play Hamlet, and the poets Dante and Blake.

One of his most important prose works, "Tradition and the Individual Talent", which was originally published in two parts in The Egoist, is a part of The Sacred Wood.

The essay "Philip Massinger" contains the famous line (often misquoted) "Immature poets imitate, mature poets steal".

References

1920 non-fiction books
1920 essays
Books of literary criticism
Essays by T. S. Eliot
Essay collections